Eoophyla mormodes is a moth in the family Crambidae. It was described by Snellen in 1897. It is found on the Sangihe Islands.

References

Eoophyla
Moths described in 1897